Andrei Mureșanu is a residential district of Cluj-Napoca in Romania. It is named after the Romanian poet and revolutionary of Transylvania, Andrei Mureșanu.

Districts of Cluj-Napoca